The Substitute Minister is a 1915 American short film directed by  B. Reeves Eason.

Cast
 Vivian Rich
 Roy Stewart
 Gayne Whitman

References

External links

1915 films
1915 short films
American silent short films
American black-and-white films
Films directed by B. Reeves Eason
1910s American films